Iron Island may refer to:

Places
 East Lovejoy, Buffalo, nicknamed Iron Island
 Iron Island (Ontario), an island in Lake Nipissing, Ontario, Canada
 Iron Island, an island to the south of Long Island (Placentia Bay, Newfoundland and Labrador)

Arts, entertainment, and media
 Ilha de Ferro, a 2018–2019 Brazilian web series
 Iron Island (film), a 2005 Iranian film
 Iron Island, a fictional location in Sinnoh, the continent featured in Pokémon Diamond and Pearl
 Iron Islands, a fictional location in the media series Game of Thrones
 The Iron Island, a 1910 serial by Edwy Searles Brooks
 The Iron Island, a 2015 short story by Jeff Somers

See also
Iony Island, a remote island in the Russian Far East